Constitutional Assembly elections were held in Ecuador on 16 October 1966, following a coup d'état the previous year.

Results

References

Elections in Ecuador
Ecuador
1966 in Ecuador
Election and referendum articles with incomplete results